Janardan is a given name and may refer to the following notable people:

Janardan Chakravarti (1901–1987), renowned scholar in Vaishnav literature and a celebrated professor of Bengali
Janardan Dhakal, member of 2nd Nepalese Constituent Assembly
Janardan Dwivedi, Indian politician of the Indian National Congress party
Janardan Singh Gehlot, Indian sports administrator
Rajeev Janardan (born 1967), Indian classical sitar player of the Imdadkhani gharana (school)
Shrikrishna Janardan Joshi (1915–1989), Marathi novelist from Maharashtra, India
Vinayak Janardan Karandikar (1872–1909), major poet of the Marathi language of India
Janardan Manjhi (1943–2021), Indian politician
Janardan Mishra, member of the Bharatiya Janata Party and 2014 winner in the Indian general election
Janardan Navle (1902–1979), early Indian Test cricketer
Janardan Ganpatrao Negi (born 1936), Indian theoretical geophysicist, emeritus scientist at National Geophysical Research Institute
Janardan Paswan, Indian politician and two-time elected member from Chatra Vidhan Sabha constituency to Bihar and Jharkhand assembly
Shanta Janardan Shelke (1922–2002), Marathi poet and writer in the Marathi language
Janardan Singh Sigriwal, Indian politician of Bharatiya Janata Party
Janardan Swami or Janardana (born 1504), Indian scholar, a Deshpande or Deshastha Brahmin from Chalisgaon
Janardan Tiwari, Indian politician
Janardan Waghmare, Indian politician and a member of the Rajya Sabha, the upper house of the Indian Parliament
Janardan Yadav, Indian politician

See also
Janta V/S Janardan - Bechara Aam Aadmi, upcoming Bollywood film based on political satire
Janardan Rai Nagar Rajasthan Vidyapeeth, deemed university in the city of Udaipur in the Indian state of Rajasthan
Jann Arden, Canadian singer-songwriter
Janardana
Janardhan (disambiguation)
Janardhanan (disambiguation)